The Carmelite Sisters of Charity  (Spanish: Hermanas Carmelitas de la Caridad de Vedruna; Latin: Institutum Sororum Carmelitarum a Caritate; abbreviation: C.C.V. or C. a Ch.) is a religious institute of pontifical right whose members profess public vows of chastity, poverty, and obedience and follow the evangelical way of life in common.

Their mission includes education of youth and care of the sick and aged.

This religious institute was founded in Vic, Catalonia, in 1826, by Joaquina Vedruna de Mas.

The sisters have houses in Europe, America, Asia and Africa. The Generalate of the Congregation can be found in Rome, Italy.

On 31 December 2008 there are 2012 sisters in 280 communities.

External links
 Carmelite Sisters of Charity official site

Catholic female orders and societies
Religious organizations established in 1826
Catholic religious institutes established in the 19th century
1826 establishments in Spain